Neomyxus leuciscus, the acute-jawed mullet, is a species of mullet found in the tropical west and central Pacific Ocean. It is the only species in the genus Neomyxus.

Taxonomy
Some older publications used the name Neomyxus chaptalli, but the holotype of Mugil chaptalli, MNHN 8100, is actually a specimen of the flathead grey mullet, rendering leuciscus the correct name for the sharp-nosed mullet.

References

Mugilidae
Monotypic ray-finned fish genera
Fish of Hawaii
Fish of the Pacific Ocean